David Mark Everett (born September 2, 1968) is an American retired middle-distance runner who won the bronze medal in the 800-meter event at the 1991 World Championships in Tokyo.  The following year, Everett finished second in the US Olympic Trials in New Orleans behind Johnny Gray.  A few weeks later Everett beat Gray at the Bislett Games in Oslo, setting a new personal best of 1:43.40.  Everett and Gray went to Barcelona as favorites for the gold and silver medals.  However, Everett did not finish the race and Gray won the Olympic bronze behind William Tanui and Nixon Kiprotich.

Throughout his career, Everett was known for his finishing speed, a kicker, usually coming from behind on the final straightaway.  His right arm was flailing awkwardly, some said it made his body look like it was twisting. Dwight Stones reported it was from a broken arm as a child.

Everett is the former head coach of the track and field team at Birmingham-Southern College in Birmingham, Alabama.

Running career

Collegiate
Everett was born in Milton, Florida.  He attended the University of Florida in Gainesville, Florida, where he ran for the Florida Gators track and field team in National Collegiate Athletic Association (NCAA) competition.  He graduated from Florida with a bachelor's degree in exercise and sports science in 1992, and was inducted into the University of Florida Athletic Hall of Fame as a "Gator Great" in 2001.

Post-collegiate
One of his last achievements was a 4x400-meter relay gold medal at the 1997 IAAF World Indoor Championships. Everett also ran in the men's 800 meter race at the 2000 Summer Olympics, although he did not qualify to the final round, recording a time of 1:49.77.

See also 

Florida Gators
List of University of Florida alumni
List of University of Florida Olympians
List of University of Florida Athletic Hall of Fame members

References

External links 

1968 births
Living people
American male middle-distance runners
Athletes (track and field) at the 1988 Summer Olympics
Athletes (track and field) at the 1992 Summer Olympics
Athletes (track and field) at the 2000 Summer Olympics
Florida Gators men's track and field athletes
Olympic track and field athletes of the United States
People from Milton, Florida
World Athletics Championships medalists
Goodwill Games medalists in athletics
World Athletics Indoor Championships winners
Competitors at the 1990 Goodwill Games
Competitors at the 1998 Goodwill Games